Wahoo! is an album by American pianist and arranger Duke Pearson, featuring performances recorded in 1964 and released on the Blue Note label in 1964.

Reception

The AllMusic review by Stephen Thomas Erlewine calls the album "A truly wonderful advanced hard bop date, Wahoo captures pianist Duke Pearson at his most adventurous and creative... one of the finest sophisticated hard bop dates Blue Note released in the mid-'60s".

Track listing
All compositions by Duke Pearson, except where noted.

 "Amanda" – 9:26
 "Bedouin" – 9:30
 "Farewell Machelle" – 2:48
 "Wahoo" – 7:19
 "ESP (Extrasensory Perception)" – 7:50
 "Fly Little Bird Fly" (Donald Byrd) – 6:11

Personnel 
 Duke Pearson – piano
 Donald Byrd – trumpet (all tracks except #3)
 James Spaulding – alto saxophone, flute (all tracks except #3)
 Joe Henderson – tenor saxophone (all tracks except #3)
 Bob Cranshaw – bass
 Mickey Roker – drums

References 

Blue Note Records albums
Duke Pearson albums
1965 albums
Albums produced by Alfred Lion
Albums recorded at Van Gelder Studio